The 2008 Brazilian federal budget was submitted to the National Congress of Brazil by President Luiz Inácio Lula da Silva on 5 September 2007.

Total receipts
The total receipts for fiscal year 2008 are estimated at R$1.4 trillion (all values below are given in Brazilian Real).

Primary receipts: $682.7 billion
 $448.7 billion - Federal taxes and tributes
 $157 billion - Social security contributions
 $77 billion - Other
Financial income: $669.7 billion
State enterprises: $62 billion

Total expenses
The total expenses for 2008 amount to $1.4 trillion.

Mandatory spending: $502.1 billion
 $114.9 billion - Transfers to States and Municipalities
 $130.8 billion - Payroll
 $198.7 billion - Social security
 $34.4 billion - Unemployment and other welfare benefits
 $3.9 billion - Export subsidy
 $19.4 billion - Other mandatory expenses
Discretionary spending: $129.6 billion
Financial spending: $720.9 billion
 $504.5 billion - Public debt amortization
 $152.2 billion - Public debt interest
 $64.2 billion - Other financial expenses
Investments in State enterprises: $62 billion

References
 Chamber of Deputies: 2008 General Budget Retrieved on 14 December 2007.

External links
 Chamber of Deputies 2008 Budget Portal
 Federal Senate Federal Budget Portal
 Ministry of Planning, Budget and Management - Federal Budget Secretary (SOF)

Federal
Brazilian budgets
Brazilian federal budget